Rare Book School (RBS) is an independent 501(c)(3) non-profit organization based at the University of Virginia. It supports the study of the history of books, manuscripts, and related objects. Each year, RBS offers about 30 five-day courses on these subjects. Most of the courses are offered at its headquarters in Charlottesville, Virginia but others are held in New York City, Washington, D.C., and Baltimore, Maryland. Its courses are intended for teaching academics, archivists, antiquarian booksellers, book collectors, conservators and bookbinders, rare book and special collections librarians, and others with an interest in book history.

The school was founded in 1983 at Columbia University by Terry Belanger, and moved to the University of Virginia in 1992. In 2005, Belanger received a $500,000 MacArthur Genius Grant from the John D. and Catherine T. MacArthur Foundation for his work in supporting the study of the history of books and printing by offering training opportunities to rare book and special collections librarians and curators, antiquarian booksellers, academics, bookbinders and conservators, and book collectors. Belanger retired as director of RBS at the end of August 2009; his successor is Michael F. Suarez, S.J.

History and mission 

Terry Belanger founded the Book Arts Press at the Columbia University School of Library Service in 1972 as a laboratory for various programs concerned with the history of books and printing, descriptive bibliography, the antiquarian book trade, and rare book and special collections librarianship. Belanger became University Professor and Honorary Curator of Special Collections at the University of Virginia in 1992. The BAP and its collections moved with him to Charlottesville, its name was changed in 2000 to Rare Book School, and for the most part the Book Arts Press name was restricted to RBS publications.

At UVa, RBS supports courses concerning the history of the book and related subjects. It carries on  exhibition and publication programs under the Book Arts Press imprint, and it sponsors public lectures—notably the annual Sol. M. and Mary Ann O'Brian Malkin Lecture in Bibliography. But its principal activity is an annually-offered schedule of about 30 short non-credit courses on subjects ranging from the history of bookbinding to modern fine printing. The majority of these courses are offered in Charlottesville, but courses are also currently offered in New York City (at the Grolier Club and at The Morgan Library & Museum), in Baltimore (at the Walters Art Museum and Johns Hopkins University, in Washington, DC (at the Freer Gallery of Art/Arthur M. Sackler Gallery), in Cambridge, MA (at Houghton Library), in New Haven, CT (at the Beinecke Rare Book & Manuscript Library), and in Bloomington, IN (at the Lilly Library). Many of its faculty are world-renowned in their field, and it has extensive teaching collections. Its students apply competitively for admission to the school's five-day courses. RBS students, typically about 40 years old, include curators and rare book librarians, established and young academics, antiquarian booksellers, book conservators and binders, and book collectors. The school employs a course evaluation system in which attendees write detailed prose accounts of their experience at the school. Their comments are then mounted permanently and in their entirety on the school's web site.

Collections 

RBS has a collection of printing presses and equipment that includes a replica eighteenth-century wooden rolling press (constructed according to plans in Diderot’s Encyclopédie), a 19th-century Washington iron hand-press (such presses could be broken down and loaded into a Conestoga wagon), and a 20th-century flatbed cylinder proof press (a Vandercook SP-15, favorite of modern private-press letterpress printers). RBS staff also run printing demonstrations on a full-scale reproduction of a wooden common press (of the sort Benjamin Franklin might have used) owned by UVA. RBS's printing-house comprises 200 cases of printing type (including the 48-case Annenberg collection of wood type), a small Brand etching press, and various pieces of hand bookbinding equipment.

RBS owns about 80,000 books and 20,000 prints, as well as a smaller collection of manuscript materials dating from 300 BCE to the present. Many of the books—including a large collection assembled to illustrate the history of cloth bookbindings—are on display in the McGregor Room of UVA’s main library. Others may be seen in glass-fronted bookcases in the Dome Room of the Rotunda (the original library of the University), located a short distance from the main library on the University’s Central Grounds. Other collections are kept in the RBS’s classrooms—rooms that make up the RBS suite in the main library.

In 2022, Rare Book School held an exhibition at the Grolier Club: Building the Book from the Ancient World to the Present Day: Five Decades of Rare Book School & the Book Arts Press. Curated by Barbara Heritage (RBS Associate Director & Curator of Collections) and Ruth-Ellen St. Onge (formerly RBS Associate Curator and Special Collections Librarian), the show (held from September 28 through December 23) includes more than 200 items drawn from the School’s teaching collections; an online version of the exhibition is freely available in the form of an Omeka site. Stories about the exhibition have appeared in Forbes and the New York Times. (UVA Today also ran a story about it.) Forbes described the show and its accompanying book as “a comprehensive primer on how . . . objects can be read by careful observation of physical attributes, and how the reading experience can be enriched by taking into account more than the printed matter.”

RBS classes make heavy use of the RBS collections. The institute annually attracts about 300 students, who come for one or more five-day non-credit courses taught by an international roster of specialists in the history of the manuscript book, typography, book illustration, bookbinding, descriptive bibliography, rare book librarianship, and related subjects. While they are at UVa, many RBS students and faculty members live on the Lawn in rooms designed by Thomas Jefferson, the founder of the University.

The physical arrangement of the RBS book and print collection supports both classroom and independent study. The books are generally shelved by date (rather than by author or subject), to show the chronological development of parchment, leather, cloth, and paper bindings. Many of the prints are filed by technique (rather than by artist or engraver), to facilitate the identification of illustration processes. Other RBS collection arrangements assist the study of various formats, genres, materials, and physical features such as sewing structures, endpapers, and dust-jackets. An unusual feature of some of these collections is the presence of multiple copies (sometimes as many as a dozen or more) of the same (or almost the same) book—a duplication valuable not only for facilitating group viewing in the classroom but also for demonstrating the bibliographical principle that almost exactly the same can be another way of saying quite different.

RBS also maintains a library of about 2,000 recently published books on various aspects of the history of the book: paper making, typefounding, typography, printing, illustration, binding, publishing, bookselling, collecting, the antiquarian book trade, and related areas. This non-circulating reference collection ensures that the most useful books for RBS's purposes are always close at hand. Supplementing this library are much larger holdings on the same subjects in UVA's main stacks and in various UVA special collections.

Website 

Rare Book School's website contains a variety of material of potential interest to those who wish to pursue the study of the history of the book and related fields, whether independently or within a classroom setting. All RBS courses have advance reading lists, freely available to all who wish to consult them, whether admitted to a course or not. There is a frequently updated of the principal librarians, curators, directors, and the like working in member institutions of the Association of Research Libraries. The school's faculty directory provides information about many prominent students of book history and related subjects. The website Links page provides a short but carefully structured guide to various resources in the field, and it provides information about current and previous RBS exhibitions, and forthcoming and previous public lectures (generally about a dozen per year).  James Green, Librarian of the Library Company of Philadelphia, gave Rare Book School lecture no. 500 in July 2007.

Exhibitions program 

In 1995, RBS began to mount book exhibitions in the Dome Room of the UVa Rotunda, the principal room of the University. (The UVa Library's Special Collections department mounted its own exhibitions in Alderman Library's McGregor Room until 2004, when it shifted its operations to a space in the new building, Harrison/Small.) Most of the exhibitions have been conceived and mounted by students in one or another of Terry Belanger's undergraduate courses in the history of the book. Among the more notable student exhibitions are "Books Go to War: Armed Service Editions in World War II]," curated in 1996 by Daniel J. Miller ('96); "Two for a Nickel," an exhibition of Thomas Jefferson and Monticello ephemera, curated in 1999 by Elliot Tally ('99); "Reading with and without Dick and Jane: the Politics of Literacy in c20 America", curated in 2003 by Elizabeth Tandy Shermer ('03); and "The Call of the Wild: Character Building and the Boy Scout Handbook," curated in 2005 by William Ingram ('05). RBS's ongoing program of large-scale book exhibitions using undergraduate curators who have almost complete control over their contents is thought to be the only one of its kind in the United States. Other RBS exhibitions include the widely reviewed  "Eyre Apparent: An Exhibition Celebrating Charlotte Bronte's Classic Novel," co-curated by John Buchtel (formerly on the RBS staff) and Barbara Heritage (RBS curator of collections, which traveled to the Peabody Institute Library at Johns Hopkins University in 2007, after its 2005-06 showing in the Dome Room.

Governance 

During its Columbia University years, RBS had no independent existence; it was part of the University's School of Library Service. When the library school closed in 1992 and RBS moved to the University of Virginia, the school became a non-profit corporation in Virginia. RBS was granted tax-exempt (501(c)(3)) status by the Internal Revenue Service in 2002, and UVa's Alumni Fund, which had held RBS's assets in trust since 1992, turned them over to the RBS Board of Directors, and the school became fully independent. In 2007, RBS was granted Affiliated Foundation status by UVa's Board of Visitors.

 the chair of the RBS Board of Directors was John Crichton (San Francisco, CA); Szilvia Szmuk-Tanenbaum (New York, NY) was vice-chair; Beppy Landrum Owen (Orlando, FL) was secretary; Joan M. Friedman (Urbana, IL) was treasurer. Michael F. Suarez, S.J., was the executive director of Rare Book School.

Succession 

In 2007, RBS director Terry Belanger announced that he planned to step down as director of RBS in 2009. In the summer of 2008, UVa and RBS established a joint search committee chaired by Beverly P. Lynch to find a successor. On June 18, 2009, UVa President John T. Casteen III announced that Michael F. Suarez had accepted appointments as University Professor and Professor of English at UVa and as director of RBS, effective September 1, 2009.

Friends of Rare Book School 

Rare Book School and the Book Arts Press are supported by a 650-member friends group, the Friends of Rare Book School. Since 1976, individual Friends have contributed more than $2 million, as well as many gifts in kind. In addition, more than two hundred North American and European libraries have donated unwanted, damaged, and defective books (or parts of books) both old and new to the RBS collections.

There are five classes of Friends. The regular membership is $50/year. Good Friends of Rare Book School contribute $100 or more/year, Very Good Friends pay $250 or more/year, Close Friends pay $500 or more/year, and Best Friends donate $1,000 or more/year. As part of their membership, Friends of Rare Book School receive an occasional newsletter, and a copy of the Book Arts Press Address Book, published every other year.

The Campaign for RBS 

At the beginning of 2006, RBS embarked on the public phase of a $2 million endowment campaign (the school's endowment then stood at about $150,000). The campaign was supported by a $333,000 3:1 challenge grant from the National Endowment for the Humanities, awarded in June 2006, and by a bequest of approximately $835,000 from the late Mary Ann O'Brian Malkin. The first phase of the campaign ended in December 2008, having raised $1 million in NEH matching funds.

Year-round staff 

The year-round staff members at Rare Book School are:
 Michael F. Suarez, S.J., Executive Director
 Barbara Heritage, Associate Director & Curator of Collections
 Danielle Culpepper, Director of Budget & Finance
 Michael X. Taylor, Accounting Specialist
 Amy Speckart, Assistant to the Director
 Lindsay M. Borman, Pine Tree-Fearrington Rare Materials Cataloger
 Adam Miller, Development Director
 Laura Toscano, Assistant Director, Development Services
 Laura Perrings, Director of Programs & Education
 Evan Cheney, Program Manager
 Ally Geoffray, Assistant Program Manager
 Hallie Terry, Admissions Officer
 Philip Mogen, Miranker Online Course Manager
 Laura Eidam, Director of Communications & Outreach
 Kim Curtis, Communications Specialist

Former year-round staff members at Rare Book School include:
 Terry Belanger, Director (1992–2009)
 Jeremy Dibbell, Director of Communications & Outreach
 Carolyn Cades Engel, Office Manager (2006–2008)
 E. Kenneth Giese, Assistant to the Director
 Amanda Nelsen, Director of Programs & Education
 Ryan Roth, Program Director (2007–2010)
 William Ingram, Program Director (2005–2007)
 Nathaniel Adams, Program Director (2004–2005)
 John Buchtel, various positions (1997–2004)
 Ruth-Ellen St. Onge, Associate Curator (2015–2022)
 Donna Sy, Director of Technology 
 Marian Toledo Candelaria, Program Manager, Andrew W. Mellon Fellowship for Diversity, Inclusion & Cultural Heritage (CHF) (2021–2022)

References

Further reading

External links
Rare Book School home page
Rare Book School Exhibitions

University of Virginia
Education in Albemarle County, Virginia
Education in Charlottesville, Virginia
1983 establishments in Virginia
Columbia University